The 2021 season was South East Stars' second season, in which they competed in the 50 over Rachael Heyhoe Flint Trophy and the new Twenty20 competition, the Charlotte Edwards Cup. The side finished fifth in the group stage of the Rachael Heyhoe Flint Trophy, winning three of their seven matches.

In the Charlotte Edwards Cup, the side finished top of Group A, winning five of their six matches, therefore progressing directly to the final. There, they played Northern Diamonds, who made 138/4 batting first. In response, a 71-run opening partnership from Bryony Smith and Aylish Cranstone along with 40* from 26 balls from Player of the Match Alice Capsey ensured the side won by 5 wickets to become the inaugural winners of the tournament.
 
The side was captained by Tash Farrant, with Bryony Smith standing-in whilst Farrant was away with England. They were coached by the newly appointed Johann Myburgh. They played four home matches at the County Ground, Beckenham, as well as one apiece at The Oval, the St Lawrence Ground and Woodbridge Road, Guildford.

Squad
South East Stars announced their initial 19-player squad on 24 May 2021. Alexa Stonehouse was promoted to the senior squad from the Academy on 25 June 2021. Ryana MacDonald-Gay was promoted to the senior squad from the Academy on 30 August 2021. Age given is at the start of South East Stars' first match of the season (29 May 2021).

Rachael Heyhoe Flint Trophy

Season standings

 Advanced to the final
 Advanced to the play-off

Fixtures

Tournament statistics

Batting

Source: ESPN Cricinfo Qualification: 100 runs.

Bowling

Source: ESPN Cricinfo Qualification: 5 wickets.

Charlotte Edwards Cup

Group A

 Advanced to the final
 Advanced to the semi-final

Fixtures

Final

Tournament statistics

Batting

Source: ESPN Cricinfo Qualification: 50 runs.

Bowling

Source: ESPN Cricinfo Qualification: 5 wickets.

Season statistics

Batting

Bowling

Fielding

Wicket-keeping

References

South East Stars seasons
2021 in English women's cricket